Halitholus is a genus of cnidarians belonging to the family Pandeidae.

The genus has almost cosmopolitan distribution.

Species:
 Halitholus cirratus Hartlaub, 1913
 Halitholus intermedius (Browne, 1902)

References

Pandeidae
Hydrozoan genera